The 126 Squadron "Cougar" is a helicopter squadron of the Republic of Singapore Air Force. Its motto is "Ready and Able", with the Cougar adopted as the squadron's motif.

Unit history
Formed initially on 16 September 1992 at Sembawang Air Base, the 126 Squadron consisted of fourteen newly purchased Aérospatiale AS532UL Cougar medium lift helicopters, which were an upgraded version of the Super Puma helicopters then used by its sister squadron – 125 SQN. The squadron is  based at Oakey Airbase, supporting the SAF's training need in Australia.

Aircraft operated
14× AS532UL Cougars (1996–present)

Photo gallery

References

External links
RSAF web page on 126 Sqn & Sembawang Air Base(SBAB)

Squadrons of the Republic of Singapore Air Force
Mandai